The Five Houses of Chán (also called the Five Houses of Zen) were the five major schools of Chan Buddhism that originated during Tang China.  Although at the time they were not considered formal schools or sects of Buddhism, they are now regarded as important schools in the history of Chán Buddhism.  Most Chán lineages throughout Asia and the rest of the world originally grew from or were heavily influenced by the original five houses of Chán.

East Mountain Teaching

The period of Daoxin ( 580–651) and Daman Hongren ( 601–674) came to be called the East Mountain Teaching, due to the location of the residence of Hongren at Huamgmei. The term was used by Shenxiu (神秀 606?–706), the most important successor to Hongren.

In 701, Shenxiu was invited to the Imperial Court by Empress Wu, who paid him due imperial reverence. The first lineage documents were produced in this period.

According to tradition, the sixth and last ancestral founder, Huineng (惠能; 638–713), was one of the giants of Chán history, and all surviving schools regard him as their ancestor. Shenhui, a successor to Huineng claimed Huineng to be the successor of Hongren's, instead of the then publicly recognized successor Shenxiu. The most prominent of the successors of Shenhui's lineage was Guifeng Zongmi

Shenhui's influence is traceable in the Platform Sutra, which gives a popular account of the story of Huineng, but also reconciles the antagonism created by Shenhui. Shenhui himself does not figure in the Platform Sutra; he was effectively written out of Chán-history.

From the East Mountain Teachings descend the Five Houses of Chán, via various lineages.

The Five Houses
The five houses were each defined by a unique method of teaching.  Each school's methods were significantly different from the others, though it was not unheard of for teachers from one school to use the methods of another.

Guiyang school

The Guiyang school (潙仰宗 Guíyáng, Jpn. Igyō) was the first established school of the Five Houses of Zen. Guiyang is named after master Guishan Lingyou (771–854) (Kuei-shan Ling-yu, Jpn. Isan Reiyū) and his student, Yangshan Huiji (807-883, or 813–890) (Yang-shan Hui-chi, Jpn. Kyōzan Ejaku).

Guishan was a disciple of Baizhang Huaihai, the Chinese Zen master whose disciples included Huangbo Xiyun (who in turn taught Línjì Yìxuán, founder of the Linji School).  After founding the Guiyang School, Yangshan moved his school to what is now modern Jiangxi.

The Guiyang school is distinct from the other schools due to its use of esoteric metaphors and imagery in the school's kōans and other teachings.

Over the course of Song Dynasty (960–1279), the Guiyang school, along with the Fayan and Yunmen schools were absorbed into the Linji school. Chán master Hsu Yun, however, attempted to revive absorbed lineages. The attempt was successful regarding the Guiyang school, Hsuan Hua being its most known modern representative.

Linji school

The Linji was named after Chán master Línjì Yìxuán, who was notable for teaching students in ways that included shouting and striking in an attempt to help students reach enlightenment. The Linji school is the predominant Chinese Chán school.

Caodong school

The Caodong school was founded by Dongshan Liangjie and his Dharma-heirs in the 9th century. Some attribute the name "Cáodòng" as a union of "Dongshan" and "Caoshan" from one of his Dharma-heirs, Caoshan Benji; however, the "Cao" could also have come from Cáoxī (曹溪), the "mountain-name" of Huineng, the Sixth Ancestor of Chan.  The sect emphasized sitting meditation, and later "silent illumination" techniques.

In 826 Korean Seon Master Doui, a student of Sixth Ancestor of Chan Huineng, brought Chan/Seon (Korean Zen) to Korea and founded the "Nine Mountain Seon Monasteries" which adopted the name Jogye order.

In 1227 Dōgen Zenji, a former Tendai student, studied Caodong Buddhism and returned to Japan to establish the Sōtō school. The Caodong school is still a respectable Chinese Chán school and is second only to Linji in number of monks and temples.

Fayan school

The Fayan school (法眼宗) was named after Chinese Chán Master Fayan Wenyi (Fa-yen Wen-i), who lived from 885  to 958.

Yunmen school

The Yunmen school was named for Yunmen Wenyan. The school thrived into the early Song Dynasty, with particular influence on the upper classes, and culminated in the final compilation of the Blue Cliff Record. Later during the Song Dynasty, the school was absorbed into the Linji school. The lived on into the modern era through Master Hsu Yun (1840–1959).

The Five Houses during the Song Dynasty
Over the course of Song Dynasty (960–1279), the Guiyang, Fayan, and Yunmen houses were gradually absorbed into the Linji house.  Caodong was transmitted to Japan in the 13th century from Ven. Rujing of Tiantong Temple to Ven. Dōgen leading to the creation of the Sōtō Zen school.

Chan during the Ming and Qing Dynasty

Chan in the modern era
Both Linji and Caodong are still practiced in China today.  Ven. Sheng-yen is an example of a modern Linji and Caodong teacher.  Ven. Hsu Yun revived the Guiyang school, Fayan school and the Yunmen school in China.

See also

 Chan Buddhism
 Zen lineage charts

References

Works cited

Sources

 

ja:禅#五家七宗